Andrew Anderson may refer to:

Politics and law
 Andrew Anderson, Lord Anderson (1862–1936), Scottish barrister, judge and Liberal Party politician
 Andrew Anderson (mayor) (1795–1867), American politician, mayor of Nashville, Tennessee
 Andrew Anderson (St. Augustine, Florida) (1839–1924), American politician, mayor of St. Augustine, Florida
 Andrew Anderson (West Virginia politician), American businessman and politician
 A. C. Anderson (Andrew Charles Anderson, 1909–1996), Canadian pharmacist and politician
 Andrew J. Anderson (1837–?), American politician from Wisconsin

Sports
 Andrew Anderson (baseball) (died 1989), American Negro leagues baseball player
 Andrew Anderson (basketball) (1945–2019), American basketball player
 Andrew Anderson (bowler) (born 1995), American professional bowler
 Andrew Anderson (draughts) (died 1861), Scottish draughts player
 Andrew Anderson (footballer) (1909–1991), Scottish footballer
 Andrew Anderson (tennis) (born 1983), South African tennis player
 Andrew Anderson (wrestler) (born 1967), American professional wrestler

Others
 Andrew Anderson (journalist), Scottish broadcast journalist
 Andrew Anderson (riverboat skipper) (1895–1958), New Zealand riverboat skipper
 Andrew B. Anderson Jr. (1926–2016), American Air Force general

See also
 Andy Anderson (disambiguation)
 Drew Anderson (disambiguation)
 Andrew Andersons (born 1942), Australian architect